The Book of the Bastiles; The history of the working of the new poor law was a book written by G.R.W. Baxter and published in 1841 . It was a collection of evidence which aimed to highlight the negative effects of the New Poor Law.

See also
Poor Law Amendment Act

References

External links
 The Book of the Bastiles

Poor Law in Britain and Ireland
1841 books